Bhiwadi is a planned city in Alwar district of the Indian state of Rajasthan. It is located 85 km from the city of Alwar and situated on the Rajasthan-Haryana border. It is the most polluted city in the world.

Geography
Bhiwadi is situated at 28.21°N, 76.87°E. It is 60 km away from New Delhi, 200 km from Jaipur, 90 km from Alwar, 40 km from Gurgaon and 50 km from Faridabad (PROP Touch India Sec-49). It can be reached by National Highway NH48 (Delhi-Jaipur highway) via Dharuhera, in 50 min from Hero Honda Chowk (Gurgaon) and in 70-90 min from IGI Airport, New Delhi.  It can also be reached by the Gurgaon-Sohna-Tauru-Dharuhera road.

The nearest railway station is Rewari Junction, 26 km south of city.

The nearest Airport is Indira Gandhi International Airport, 55 km north of the city.

Demographics
As of the 2011 Census of India, Bhiwadi had and a

population of 104,883. Males constituted 57% and females 43% of the population. The sex ratio of Bhiwadi city is 800 females per 1000 males.

Economy
The town is spread over nearly 5,300 acres with houses covering around 2,700. The town contains a range of large, medium and small scale industries, from steel mills and furnaces to automobile and electronics manufacturing.

See also
 Kundli-Manesar-Palwal Expressway
 National Highway 8 (India)
 Dharuhera
 Nikhri
 Industrial Area Khushkhera

References

 
Cities and towns in Alwar district